The 2021–22 Arkansas–Pine Bluff Golden Lions men's basketball team represented the University of Arkansas at Pine Bluff in the 2021–22 NCAA Division I men's basketball season. The Golden Lions, led by first-year head coach Solomon Bozeman, played their home games at the H. O. Clemmons Arena in Pine Bluff, Arkansas as members of the Southwestern Athletic Conference.

Previous season
In a season limited due to the ongoing COVID-19 pandemic, the Golden Lions finished the 2020–21 season 4–21, 3–12 in SWAC play to finish in ninth place. In the SWAC tournament, they lost in the quarterfinals to Fairfield.

On April 17, 2021, head coach George Ivory announced his resignation, leaving the program after 13 years at the helm. On June 11, the school named Oral Roberts assistant Solomon Bozeman as Ivory's replacement.

Roster

Schedule and results

|-
!colspan=12 style=| Non-conference regular season

|-
!colspan=12 style=| SWAC regular season

Sources

References

Arkansas–Pine Bluff Golden Lions men's basketball seasons
Arkansas–Pine Bluff Golden Lions
Arkansas–Pine Bluff Golden Lions men's basketball
Arkansas–Pine Bluff Golden Lions men's basketball